The Copa América is South America's major tournament in senior men's soccer and determines the continental champion. Until 1967, the tournament was known as South American Championship. It is the oldest continental championship in the world.

The United States are not members of the South American football confederation CONMEBOL. But because CONMEBOL only has ten member associations, guest nations have regularly been invited since 1993. With four participations, the U.S. are the second-most regular invitee behind Mexico (10 participations).

In 2016, the U.S. were hosts of the Copa América Centenario, which celebrated the hundredth anniversary of the tournament with a larger competition, co-organized by CONCACAF and CONMEBOL. This makes them the only non-South American country to ever host a Copa-match. Before, they have been invited guests in 1993, 1995 and 2007.

Record at the Copa América

* Draws include matches decided on penalties.

Match Overview

Record Players

Top Goalscorers

See also

United States at the FIFA World Cup
United States at the CONCACAF Gold Cup

References

External links
RSSSF archives and results
Soccerway database

Countries at the Copa América
United States men's national soccer team